Greiner is a surname, and may refer to:

In arts and entertainment
 Gotthelf Greiner (1732–1797), German glass-maker, inventor of modern porcelain 
 Josef Greiner (c. 1886–1947), Austrian writer
 Lori Greiner (born 1969), American inventor and TV personality 
 Otto Greiner (1869–1916), German painter
 Stefan-Peter Greiner (born 1966), German violin-maker
 Matt Greiner (born 1985), American metalcore drummer
 Virginie Greiner (born 1969), French comic book scriptwriter

In government, military, and politics
 Heinz Greiner (1895-1977), German Army General
 Hermann Greiner (1920-2014), German Luftwaffe ace
 Jon J. Greiner (21st century), American politician
 Kathryn Greiner (born 1946), Australian politician 
 Nick Greiner (born 1947), Australian politician
 Sandy Greiner (born 1945), American politician
 Theodor Ludwig Greiner, German revolutionary 
 William P. Greiner, New York state legislator 1914–1916
 Willy Greiner (1919-2000), Norwegian politician

In science
 Helen Greiner (born 1967), American roboticist
 Ludwig Greiner (1796-1882), German-Austrian forester
 Markus Greiner (born 1973), German physicist
 Walter Greiner (born 1935), German physicist

In sport
 Arthur Greiner (1884-1916), American racecar driver
 Cindy Greiner (born 1957), American heptathlete
 Frank Greiner (born 1966), German football coach
 Grayson Greiner (born 1992), American baseball player
 Harold Greiner (1907-1993), American baseball manager and restaurant entrepreneur
 Holden Greiner (born 1991), American basketball player
 Janine Greiner (born 1981), Swiss curler
 Robin Greiner (born 1932), American pair skater
 Thomas Greiner (born 1963), German rower

In other fields
 Bill Greiner (1934-2009), American university president
 Harold Greiner (1907-1993), American baseball manager and restaurant entrepreneur
 Justine Greiner (born 1963), American model
 Lori Greiner (born 1969), American inventor and TV personality 
 Russell Greiner, Canadian computer science professor